Jibu may be,

Jibu language, Nigeria
Jibu language (Papuan)
Jibu Jacob
Jibu Sani